Tracey Corderoy (born 12 April 1965) is a British children's writer.  She has published over 70 books since 2010, and works with publishers; Little Tiger Press, Nosy Crow, Scholastic Children's Books, Alison Green Books, Meadowside Children's Book, Egmont and Stripes.

Awards 
Shifty McGifty and Slippery Sam - Santa's Stolen Sleigh selected as one of the top 42 books for children in 2021
Winner of the Hounslow Junior Book Award 2014 for Baddies Beasties and a Sprinkling of Crumbs (published by Stripes).
Winner of the Hillingdon Picture Book of the Year in 2011 for her book The Grunt and The Grouch (published by Little Tiger Press).
Shortlisted for the second year running for the 2012 Hillingdon Picture Book of the Year for her picture book Hubble Bubble Granny Trouble  (published by Nosy Crow).
Shortlisted for the 2012 Independent Booksellers Week Award for her picture book, Never Say No to a Princess! (published by Alison Green Books).
Nominated for the 2012 People's Book Prize  for her picture book, Whizz Pop, Granny STOP! (published by Nosy Crow).

Background 
Corderoy grew up in Sandfields, Port Talbot in South Wales.

When Corderoy was eighteen she moved to Bath to study at Bath College of Higher Education (later known as Bath Spa University) to be a primary school teacher, graduating in 1987.
After teaching positions in Swindon and Cirencester, she left the teaching profession to start a family.

Several years later, Corderoy started working with children in primary schools; where she implemented literacy programmes and re-integrated children returning to school following periods of long-term illness. It was during this time that she became passionate about writing for children – convinced that language, expressed through wonderful literature, is the key that stimulates learning and imagination.

Books

Picture books 
Shifty McGifty and Slippery Sam - Santa's Stolen Sleigh ( Illustrator – Steven Lenton )( Nosy Crow 2021 )
I Love School! ( Illustrator – Tim Warnes )( Little Tiger Press 2020 )
It's only one! ( Illustrator – Tony Neal )( Little Tiger Press 2020 )
Impossible! ( Illustrator – Tony Neal )( Little Tiger Press 2020 )
Mouse's Night Before Christmas ( Illustrator – Sarah Massini )( Nosy Crow 2019 )
The Boy and the Bear ( Illustrator – Sarah Massini )( Nosy Crow 2019 )
The One Stop Story Shop ( Illustrator – Tony Neal )( Little Tiger Press 2019 )
Sneaky Beak ( Illustrator – Tony Neal )( Little Tiger Press 2019 )
The Christmas Extravaganza Hotel ( Illustrator – Tony Neal )( Little Tiger Press 2018 )
Shifty McGifty and Slippery Sam - The Missing Masterpiece ( Illustrator – Steven Lenton )( Nosy Crow 2018 )
The Boy and the Bear ( Illustrator – Sarah Massini )( Nosy Crow 2018 )
It's Christmas! ( Illustrator – Tim Warnes )( Little Tiger Press 2017 )
Shifty McGifty and Slippery Sam - The Diamond Chase ( Illustrator – Steven Lenton )( Nosy Crow 2016 )
Shifty McGifty and Slippery Sam - The Cat Burglar ( Illustrator – Steven Lenton )( Nosy Crow 2015 )
Fairy Tale Pets ( Illustrator – Jorge Martín )( Little Tiger Press 2017 )
Squish Squash Squeeze! ( Illustrator – Jane Chapman )( Little Tiger Press 2016 )
Now! ( Illustrator – Tim Warnes )( Little Tiger Press 2015 )
Hubble Bubble, Granny Trouble ( Illustrator – Joe Berger )( Nosy Crow 2011 )
More! ( Illustrator – Tim Warnes )( Little Tiger Press 2015 )
No! ( Illustrator – Tim Warnes )( Little Tiger Press 2013 )
Why! ( Illustrator – Tim Warnes )( Little Tiger Press 2013 )
Spells-A-Popping! Granny's Shopping!  ( Illustrator – Joe Berger )( Nosy Crow 2013 )
Just Right For Two ( Illustrator – Ros Beardshaw )( Nosy Crow 2013 )
The Very Messy Mermaid ( Illustrator – Kate Leake) ( Alison Green Books 2013 )
No!  (Illustrator – Tim Warnes) (Little Tiger Press 2013)
Shifty McGifty and Slippery Sam ( Illustrator – Steven Lenton )( Nosy Crow 2013 )
I Want My Mummy! ( Illustrator – Alison Edgson )( Little Tiger Press 2013  )
Boo! ( Illustrator – Caroline Pedler )( Little Tiger Press 2013 )
A Flower in the Snow   ( Illustrator – Sophie Allsopp )( Egmont 2012 )
Wakey Wakey, Big Brown Bear ! ( Illustrator – Rachel Swirles )( Meadowside 2012)
Whizz, Pop, Granny, Stop! ( Illustrator – Joe Berger )( Nosy Crow 2012 )
It's Mine!  ( Illustrator – Caroline Peddler ) (Little Tiger Press 2012)
Monty and Milli  (Illustrator – Tim Warnes) (Little Tiger Press 2012)
Frog and Mouse  (Illustrator – Anna Popescu) (Meadowside Children's Books 2012) 
Never say NO to a Princess!  ( Illustrator – Kate Leake) ( Alison Green Books 2012 )
Just One More!    ( Illustrator – Alison Edgson) ( Little Tiger Press 2012 )()
Brave Little Penguin...  ( Illustrator – Gavin Scott ) ( Little Tiger Press 2011 )
Hubble Bubble, Granny Trouble!  ( Illustrator – Joe Berger )( Nosy Crow 2011 )
It's Potty Time!  ( Illustrator – Caroline Pedler )( Little Tiger Press 2011 )
Oh Dylan!  ( Illustrator – Tina Macnaughton )( Little Tiger Press 2011 )
Star Friends  ( Illustrator – Alison Edgson )( Little Tiger Press 2010 )
The Grunt and The Grouch  ( Illustrator – Lee Wildish )( Little Tiger Press 2010 )
The Little White Owl   ( Illustrator – Jane Chapman )( Little Tiger Press 2010 )
The Magic Christmas Star  ( Illustrator – Simon Taylor-Kielty )( Hallmark 2008 )

Young fiction 
The Story Shop Series ( Little Tiger Press )
The Story Shop: Blast Off! (2022)
 Seaview Stables Series ( Simon & Schuster )
The Pony With No Name (2018)
The Mystery at Stormy Point (2019)
Snowflakes, Silver and Secrets (2019)
 Shifty McGifty and Slippery Sam Series ( Nosy Crow )
The Spooky School (2016)
The Aliens Are Coming! (2019)
Jingle Bells (2017)
Up, Up and Away! (2017)
 Hubble Bubble Series ( Nosy Crow )
The Glorious Granny Bake Off (2013)
The Pesky Pirate Prank! (2014)
The Messy Monkey Business! (2015)
The Winter Wonderland! (2015)
The Super-Spooky Fright Night! (2014)
 The Willow Valley Series ( Scholastic )
One Snowy Day (2012)
Birthday Fun (2012)
Spooky Sleepover (2012)
The Big Bike Race (2012)
Hide and Seek (2012)
A Seaside Rescue (2013)
Toffee Apple Night (2013)
New Friends (2014)
The Great Egg Hunt (2014)
 The Grunt and The Grouch Series ( Little Tiger Press )
Pick 'n' Mix! (2010)
Freaky Funfair! (2010)
Beastly Feast! (2010)
Big Splash! (2010)
 Anthologies ( Stripes Publishing )
On a Snowy Night (2015)
Winter Wonderland (2014)

Fiction 8yr+ 
 The Crumbs Detective Series ( Stripes )
Monsters, Mayhem and a Sprinkling of Crumbs! (2013)
Baddies, Beasties and a Sprinkling of Crumbs! (2013)

Audio books 
Willow Valley: Birthday Fun & Spooky Sleepover (Unabridged) (AudiGo 2012) (ASIN: B00A2735EE)
Willow Valley: The Big Bike Race & Hide and Seek (Unabridged) (AudiGo 2012) (ASIN: B00A2732Z6)

References

External links 

www.traceycorderoy.com
Agent
Nosy Crow
Stripes publishing
Hillingdon Picture Book Award 2011
Independent Book Sellers Week Award

1965 births
Living people
Alumni of Bath Spa University
British children's writers
People from Port Talbot